The Uttar Pradesh State Road Transport Corporation (UPSRTC) is a public sector passenger road transport corporation which services Uttar Pradesh, India, and adjoining states of North India. It operates as a state and interstate bus service and has the largest fleet of buses in North India. The corporate office of the corporation is located at MG Marg in Lucknow.

History 

At the time of the establishment of the corporation, it had a fleet of 4,253 buses that were operating on 1,123 routes. The corporation's earned kilometres operated at that time were 228.8 million kilometres. At the same time, the total number of passengers carried by its buses totalled 251.3 million. By the end of the decade, the corporation's fleet had reached the size of 5,679 buses. The operations had also increased to 1,782 routes. As a result of this increase in operations, the earned kilometres totalled about 395.3 million kilometres, while the total number of passengers totalled over 449.1 million.

During the 4th five-year plan, the erstwhile UP Government Roadways was renamed as Uttar Pradesh State Road Transport Corporation (UPSRTC) on 1 June 1972 under the provisions of the Road Transport Act, 1950. The objectives of this undertaking were – 
 The development of the road transport sector correlated to which would lead to the overall development of trade & industry.
 The coordination of the road transport services with other modes of transport.
 To provide an adequate, economical & efficiently coordinated road transport service to the residents of the state.
The end of the 6th five-year plan saw a further increase in the corporation's operational parameters. With the increase in fleet strength of 6,198 buses, the earned kilometers of the corporation rose to 425.7 million kilometers. During the 7th five-year plan, emphasis was placed on strengthening the fleet of the corporation. Thus, by the end of this plan period, the fleet had risen to 8,161 buses from the initial strength of 6,198.

By 1989–90, the Corporation operated 2,525 routes covering 648.6 million kilometres and carried 471.2 million passengers. During the 8th five-year plan, 2,722 buses were replaced with new buses. However, 3,142 buses were auctioned, and the fleet at the end of 1996–97 became 7,463 buses. During the 9th five-year plan, 2,427 buses were replaced, and 3,785 buses were auctioned; at the end of 2001–02, the corporation had 6,105 buses. In the 10th five-year plan, 5,274 buses were inducted, and 4,818 buses were removed from the fleet. The Corporation was reconstituted on 30.10.03 with the services in the state of Uttarakhand forming a separate corporation. At the end of 2006–07, the corporation had 6,561 buses apart from 784 hired buses operated under its control. 

In the 10th five-year plan, 4,518 buses were inducted and 4,189 buses were removed from the fleet. At the end of 2011–12, th

e corporation had 6,890 buses apart from 1,763 hired buses operated under its control. In the 12th five-year plan, 4866 buses were inducted and 2659 buses were removed from fleet. At the end of 2016-17, the Corporation had 9277 buses apart from 2400 hired buses operated under its control.

At the end of 2020, the UPSRTC had a total fleet of 11964 buses, of which the Corporation owned 9267 while 2697 were hired.

Organizational setup
The Board of Directors manage the corporation through its Managing Director who is its Executive Head. The current M.D is Shri Sanjay Kumar. The current Chairman of the Board is Shri Rajendra Kumar Tiwari.

Infrastructure

The corporation has been divided into 20 regions for efficient functioning, of which 1 region operates urban and suburban services. Each region has a regional workshop, where major repair and maintenance, as well as assembly and reconditioning, is performed. Each region has been further divided into operational units called depots, of which there are 115, including Car-Section. Each depot has a depot workshop attached to it to provide supportive maintenance facilities. The locations of the depots are as follows: 

For heavy maintenance and repair of vehicles, reconditioning of major assemblies, renovation of buses and construction of bodies on new chassis, two Central workshops have been established in Kanpur: Central Workshop, Rawatpur and Dr Ram Manohar Lohia Workshop, Allen Forest. Eight tyre re-treading plants are established at Agra, Lucknow, Gorakhpur, Faizabad, Ghaziabad, Bareilly, Kanpur, Saharanpur, Allahabad, Moradabad and Etawah to provide in-house tyre re-treading facilities. For repairs and maintenance of staff cars belonging to the State Government and the corporation, a separate unit named Car-Section is established in Lucknow. For imparting training to drivers and technical staff, a Training School is established in Kanpur.

The state transport department is also an introducing Intelligent Transport Management System (ITMS) with a cost of Rs 38.28 crore of which 50 percent will be a grant from Government of India and the remaining 50 percent would come from private participation. With the implementation of ITMS, the entire transport department in the state would go online. UPSRTC had its own ISBT located at Lucknow.

Bus stations
The corporation has 300 bus stations of which 249 are in owned premises and 51 are in rented premises. For the convenience of passengers, the Corporation generally has restrooms, canteens, booking offices, toilets, drinking water facilities, timetables, chart displays, enquiry counters, public address systems, lights, fans, seats, benches, PCO, etc. at all its stations. Cleanliness of the bus stations and buses are accorded priority..The ground reality is totally different as the bus Stations in the different towns or ruler areas are totally zombie and in worst conditions with no facilities of pure water.The one of the biggest bus stand in uttar pradesh is Banaras but it's poor infrastructure and other facilities with extremely damaged road is the symbol of unorganised system of the public transport. Towns like Kunda has an extremely poor bus stand, fatally damaged with uneven broken road, Town like Bindki has abondand bus stand with the well constructed road since ten years. And the district like Fatehpur has poor facilities of sanitation and pure water. The large number of pessengers are suffering problems on the daily basis due to the poor infrastructure of Uttar Pradesh bus services.

Network
UPSRTC has the largest bus fleet located in North India and operates interstate buses to eight neighboring states, viz., Uttarakhand, Delhi, Bihar, Chhattisgarh, Chandigarh, Rajasthan, Punjab, Himachal Pradesh, Haryana, Jammu and Kashmir and Madhya Pradesh, along with the country of Nepal. There is a good network of interstate buses with an influx of passengers from proximate states. Its furthest places of operations in each direction are very far away. The northernmost point of operation is Katra, Jammu and Kashmir, the southernmost point is Indore, the easternmost point is Patna (if international routes are included, then it is Kathmandu, Nepal), while the westernmost point is Jodhpur. Till these points, UPSRTC operates its regular bus services for passengers.

Fleet
As of March 2020, UPSRTC operated a fleet of around 11,276 buses. Buses are primarily manufactured by Ashok Leyland and TATA. Volvo and Scania buses are also in service.

Types of buses

LOHIA GRAMIN SEWA
Operates as shuttle service between district headquarters and nearby towns/villages/tehsils. Caters to rural and economy-conscious traffic. USP – Reduced fares (around 70% of fare of ordinary services) are charged.

MINI
Operates as shuttle service between district headquarters and nearby towns/villages/tehsils. Caters to rural and time-conscious traffic. USP – Since it has 32 seats, gets filled up fast and reaches destination faster.

ORDINARY
New comfortable buses operate between various districts. Caters to the general traffic. USP – Ordinary fares are charged.

SUHANI SEWA
These buses have fixed stops & fixed time table and known for their punctuality and service.

SANKALP SEWA
The bus service will connect interior areas with big cities, these public buses are in saffron colour.

SLEEPER
New, comfortable, and AC non-AC Sleeper services for long routes. Operates between different long-distance destinations. USP – Has 28 seats on the lower tier and 15 berths on the upper tier.

JANRATH 
New, the low-cost AC bus service, very comfortable, AC and point to point services. Operates between different districts as direct services. The idea behind introducing these AC buses with reasonable fare is to make it affordable for low-income class people poor to enjoy this luxury without putting any burden on their pockets

VOLVO
Spacious and comfortable 2*2 A/c Volvo buses for ease and comfort during the journey. 45 seater, spacious, state of the art Volvo buses with great comfort services between all districts, headquarters, and major routes.

SCANIA
First transport corporation to introduce SCANIA buses in Northern India. It is a high-end bus that is world-class, affordable, safe, pleasant, and secure for tours and transportation.

CITY BUS SERVICE
Operates CNG city buses under JNNURM in Agra, Kanpur, Lucknow, Mathura, Ghaziabad, Noida, Greater Noida.

Awards and achievements 

The Uttar Pradesh State Road Transport Corporation (UPSRTC) achieved a magnificent feat by setting a Guinness Book of World Records for the largest parade of buses anywhere in the world. As many as 500 special Kumbh Mela buses were paraded for this purpose in the city of Prayagraj in Uttar Pradesh. The fleet of 500 buses was paraded on a stretch of 3.2 kilometres. Observers from the Guinness Book of World Records were present at the scene and handed over the certificate.

See also
 Lucknow Mahanagar Parivahan Sewa
 Kanpur Lucknow Roadways Service

References

External links 
Official website of UPSRTC

UPSRTC on Twitter
UPSRTC Online Bus Reservation System

Roads in Uttar Pradesh
State road transport corporations of India
State agencies of Uttar Pradesh
Transport companies established in 1947
Government agencies established in 1947
Indian companies established in 1947
Companies based in Uttar Pradesh